FreightLink was a railway freight operator in Australia that operated in the newly completed Adelaide–Darwin rail corridor between 2004 and 2010.

History
 

In 2000, the AustralAsia Railway Corporation awarded the contract to build and operate the Adelaide-Darwin railway line as a Build, Own, Operate and Transfer project to the Asia Pacific Transport Consortium, which in turn awarded the contract to FreightLink to build and operate the project.

FreightLink commenced operations in January 2004 on the Tarcoola to Darwin line. FreightLink had intermodal terminals at Adelaide, Alice Springs, Tennant Creek, Katherine, and Darwin. It performed marketing, integrated service management and management of service providers.  A number of operational activities were outsourced to specialist providers including train and terminal management, port terminal operations and rail maintenance.  

In May 2008 the consortium of banks and infrastructure companies behind Freightlink decided to sell the railway and its operating company In June 2008 FreightLink announced that it would add an extra weekly rail service between Adelaide and Darwin due to growing demand, taking the total number of services to six.

During November 2008 the company was placed into voluntary administration. This resulted in FreightLink's bankers exercising their rights to appoint a receiver, KordaMentha which then took control of the company, as the deal to sell the company fell through after a small number of the banks funding FreightLink refused the terms of the sale to the preferred bidder.

On 9 June 2010, Genesee & Wyoming signed an agreement with the receivers to buy the assets of FreightLink for $334 million. It would be operated as part of Genesee & Wyoming Australia.

Fleet
Diesel locomotives owned by FreightLink included:
4x FQ class mainline units (new build Downer EDI Rail GT46C)
2x FJ class shunters (second hand WAGR J class)

References

External links
Official site

Freight railway companies of Australia
Interstate rail in Australia
Railway companies established in 2004
Railway companies disestablished in 2010
Australian companies disestablished in 2010
Australian companies established in 2004